The Coroners and Justice Act 2009 (c. 25) is an Act of the Parliament of the United Kingdom. It changed the law on coroners and criminal justice in England and Wales.

Among its provisions are:
preventing criminals from profiting from publications about their crimes
abolishing the anachronistic offences of sedition and seditious, defamatory and obscene libel
re-enacting the provisions of the emergency Criminal Evidence (Witness Anonymity) Act 2008 so that the courts may continue to grant anonymity to vulnerable or intimidated witnesses where this is consistent with a defendant's right to a fair trial
criminalising possession of pornographic non-photographic images depicting under-18s, and of adults where the "predominant impression conveyed"  is of a person under the age of 18.
criminalising the holding of someone in slavery or servitude, or requiring them to perform forced or compulsory labour
provision for the abolition of the office of Coroner of the Queen's Household. 
 Creation of the office of Chief Coroner of England and Wales.
creation of the partial defence of loss of control.

The Act makes it illegal to own any picture depicting under-18s participating in sexual activities, or depictions of sexual activity in the presence of someone under 18. The law has been condemned by a coalition of graphic artists, publishers and MPs, fearing it will criminalise graphic novels such as Lost Girls and Watchmen. These sections came into effect on 6 April 2010.

The Act contains measures to reform the coroner system. According to the Institute of Legal Executives, "There is provision, carefully circumscribed, for the establishment of a judicial inquiry under the 2005 Inquiries Act to take the place of an inquest, where there is highly sensitive evidence (typically intercept) and it would not be possible to have an Article 2 compliant inquest. These provisions will be used in rare cases only."

The most controversial aspect of the bill are the provisions regarding secret inquests. The provisions had previously been mulled as part of the Counter-Terrorism Act 2008, though ultimately they were dropped before the Counter-Terrorism Bill was finalised. Last-minute concessions, as the Coroners and Justice Bill passed through Parliament, included giving the Lord Chief Justice the power to veto any requests for private inquests and also the power to decide who the judge is.

Hate crimes reform

The Criminal Justice and Immigration Act 2008 amended Part 3A of the Public Order Act 1986 to extend hate crime legislation to cover "hatred against a group of persons defined by reference to sexual orientation (whether towards persons of the same sex, the opposite sex or both)".

To prevent that Act being used to inhibit freedom of speech on the subject of homosexuality, the Criminal Justice and Immigration Act also inserted a new section 29JA, entitled "Protection of freedom of expression (sexual orientation)" but sometimes known as the Waddington Amendment (after Lord Waddington who introduced it). It reads:

During debate on the Coroners and Justice Bill the Government unsuccessfully attempted to repeal section 29JA. Clause 61 (which would have repealed section 29JA) was introduced into Parliament by Jack Straw on 14 January 2009. The clause was voted down by the House of Lords, reinstated by the House of Commons, and voted down again by the Lords before the Commons finally conceded that section 29JA could remain.

Notable events with respect to the act
In December 2012, owners of a family patio and paving business in Bedford were successfully prosecuted under the provision criminalising the holding of someone in slavery or servitude, or requiring them to perform forced or compulsory labour, between 2010 and 2011. The investigation of forced labour began after the body of one of the family's workers was discovered in 2008. The family found using vulnerable mentally ill, alcoholic, and homeless men for forced labour, holding some men in servitude for decades and paying them as little as £5 a day (the National Minimum Wage at the time was £5.80 per hour for an adult aged 21 or over).

See also
Coroners Act

References

External links
The Coroners and Justice Act 2009, as amended from the National Archives.
The Coroners and Justice Act 2009, as originally enacted from the National Archives.
Explanatory notes to the Coroners and Justice Act 2009.

United Kingdom Acts of Parliament 2009
Criminal law of the United Kingdom
Coroners